The Juno Award for Breakthrough Artist of the Year is an annual award given by the Canadian Academy of Recording Arts and Sciences to the best new musician in Canada. The award has been given since 1974, when it was originally divided into separate awards for men and women under the names Most Promising Female Vocalist of the Year and Most Promising Male Vocalist of the Year. These two awards were merged in 1994 into Best New Solo Artist, which was then changed to New Artist of the Year in 2003, and finally changed to its current title beginning in 2013. The award was customarily presented by the Minister of Canadian Heritage.

Recipients

Most Promising Female Vocalist of the Year and Most Promising Male Vocalist of the Year (1974–93)

Best New Solo Artist (1994–2002)

New Artist of the Year (2003–2012)

Breakthrough Artist of the Year (2013–present)

See also

Music of Canada

References

Breakthrough Artist of the Year
Music awards for breakthrough artist